Daniel K. Grimm (born April 5, 1949) is an American politician who served as the 20th Washington State Treasurer from 1989 to 1997. A member of the Democratic Party, he previously served as a member of the Washington House of Representatives, representing the 25th district from 1977 to 1989.

References

External links

Columbia University alumni
Democratic Party members of the Washington House of Representatives
Living people
People from Puyallup, Washington
State treasurers of Washington (state)
20th-century American politicians
1949 births